Heinrich Anton Dähling (19 January 1773 – 10 September 1850) was a historical and genre painter born in Hanover. In 1794 he went to Berlin, where he was engaged in miniature painting and as a teacher of drawing. In 1802 he visited Paris, and the study of the galleries there first induced him to attempt painting in oil. From 1811 until his death he was a member of the Berlin Academy, and professor at the same from 1814 onwards. He died at Potsdam on 10 September 1850. One of his most famous pictures is The Descent from the Cross, the altar-piece at the Garrison Church in Potsdam. In the Berlin Gallery is a State Entry painted by him.

See also
 List of German painters

References

External links

1773 births
1850 deaths
18th-century German painters
18th-century German male artists
German male painters
19th-century German painters
19th-century German male artists
Artists from Hanover
Academic staff of the Prussian Academy of Arts